Idol Poland (season 4) was the fourth season of Idol Poland. Maciej Silski won over Sławomir Uniatowski and Bartosz Szymoniak.

Finals

Finalists
(ages stated at time of contest)

Live Show Details

Heat 1 (26 March 2005)

Heat 2 (30 March 2005)

Heat 3 (9 April 2005)

Heat 4 (13 April 2005)

Heat 5 (16 April 2005)

Live Show 1 (23 April 2005)
Theme: My Idol

Live Show 2 (30 April 2005)
Theme: 70s Polish Hits

Live Show 3 (7 May 2005)
Theme: Kings & Queens

Live Show 4 (14 May 2005)
Theme: New Sounds

Live Show 5 (21 May 2005)
Theme: Idol in Grand Style

Live Show 6 (28 May 2005)
Theme: Latino

Live Show 7: Semi-final (4 June 2005)
Theme: Jury's Choice

Live final (18 June 2005)

External links
Official Website via Web Archive
4
2005 Polish television seasons